The Warren–Brooks Award for literary criticism was established to honor the innovative, critical interpretation of literature offered by Robert Penn Warren and Cleanth Brooks to celebrate the continuation of such achievement. It is awarded for outstanding literary criticism originally published in English in the United States of America and is given in those years when a book, or other worthy publication, appears that exemplifies the Warren–Brooks effort in spirit, scope, and integrity.

The award is given annually by the advisory group of the Center for Robert Penn Warren Studies at Western Kentucky University for outstanding literary criticism originally published in English in the United States.

Past Recipients
Past winners of the award include:
1995: Simpson, Lewis P., The Fable of the Southern Writer,  LSU Press, 1995
1996: Winchell, Mark Royden, Cleanth Brooks and the Rise of Modern Criticism, University of Virginia Press, 1996
1997: Hollander, John, The Work of Poetry, Columbia University Press, 1997
1998: Donoghue, Denis, The Practice of Reading, Yale University Press, 1998
1999: Schuchard, Ron, Eliot's Dark Angel, Oxford University Press, 1999
2000: Kermode, Sir Frank, Shakespeare's Language, Farrar, Straus, Giroux, 2000
2001: Murphy, Paul V., The Rebuke of History North Carolina Press, 2001
2002:  Burt, Stephanie, Randall Jarrell and His Age Columbia University Press, November 2002
2003:  Buell, Lawrence, Emerson, The Belknap Press of Harvard University Press, 2003
2004: (shared) Justus, James H., Fetching the Old Southwest, University of Missouri Press; Perloff, Marjorie, Differentials, University of Alabama Press
2005: Hassett, Constance W., “Christina Rossetti: The Patience of Style,” University of Virginia Press, 2005
2006: Rosen, David, Power, Plain English, and the Rise of Modern Poetry, Yale University Press, 2006
2007: Dolven, Jeff, Scenes of Instruction in Renaissance Romance, University of Chicago Press, 2007
2008: Brinkmeyer, Robert Jr., The Fourth Ghost: White Southern Writers and European Fascism, 1930-1950, Louisiana State University Press, 2008
2009: Travis, Peter, Disseminal Chaucer: Rereading the Nun's Priest's Tale, University of Notre Dame Press, 2009
2010: Payne, Mark, The Animal Part: Human and Other Animals in the Poetic Imagination, University of Chicago Press, 2010
2011: Strier, Richard, The Unrepentant Renaissance: From Petrarch to Shakespeare to Milton, University of Chicago Press, 2011
2012: Martin, Meredith, The Rise and Fall of Meter: Poetry and English National Culture, 1860-1930, Princeton University Press, 2012
2013: Brombert, Victor, Musings on Mortality: Tolstoy to Primo Levi, University of Chicago Press, 2013
2014: Russell, Richard Rankin, Seamus Heaney's Regions, University of Notre Dame Press, 2014
2015: Keniston, Ann, Ghostly Figures: Memory and Belatedness in Postwar American Poetry, University of Iowa Press, 2015
2016: Ravinthiran, Vidyan, Elizabeth Bishop's Prosaic, Bucknell University Press, 2016
2017: Costello, Bonnie, The Plural of Us: Poetry and Community in Auden and Others, Princeton University Press, 2017
2018: Polley, Diana Hope, Echoes of Emerson: Rethinking Realism in Twain, James, Wharton, and Cather, University Alabama Press, 2017
2019: Fulford, Tim, Wordsworth's Poetry, 1815-1845, University of Pennsylvania Press, 2019
2020: Shifflett, Joan Romano, Warren, Jarrell, & Lowell: Collaboration in the Reshaping of American Poetry, Louisiana State University Press, 2020
2021: Quayson, Ato, Tragedy and Postcolonial Literature, Cambridge University Press, 2021

Notes

Literary criticism
American literary awards
Western Kentucky University